The 2014 Norwegian Figure Skating Championships was held at the Sparta Amfi in Sarpsborg from January 31 to February 2, 2014. Skaters competed in the discipline of single skating.

Senior results

Men

Ladies

Junior Medalists

Ladies

External links
 2014 Norwegian Championships results
 Official site

Norwegian Figure Skating Championships
Norwegian Figure Skating Championships, 2014
2014 in Norwegian sport